Two ships of the United States Navy have been assigned the name USS Canberra, in honor of  and the city of Canberra, Australia's capital.

United States Navy ship names